Griffo is a surname. Notable people with the surname include:

Francesco Griffo (1450–1518), Venetian punchcutter
Jack Griffo (born 1996), American actor and singer 
Joseph Griffo (born 1956), American politician
Young Griffo (1871–1927), Australian boxer